Valosin-containing protein (VCP) or  transitional endoplasmic reticulum ATPase (TER ATPase) also known as p97 in mammals and CDC48 in S. cerevisiae, is an enzyme that in humans is encoded by the VCP gene. The TER ATPase is an ATPase enzyme present in all eukaryotes and archaebacteria.  Its main function is to segregate protein molecules from large cellular structures such as protein assemblies, organelle membranes and chromatin, and thus facilitate the degradation of released polypeptides by the multi-subunit protease proteasome.

p97/CDC48 is a member of the AAA+ (extended family of ATPases associated with various cellular activities) ATPase family. Enzymes of this family are found in all species from bacteria to humans.  Many of them are important chaperones that regulate folding or unfolding of substrate proteins.  p97/CDC48 is a type II AAA+ ATPase, which means that it contains two tandem ATPase domains (named D1 and D2, respectively) (Figure 1).  The two ATPase domains are connected by a short polypeptide linker. A domain preceding the D1 domain (N-terminal domain) and a short carboxyl-terminal tail are involved in interaction with cofactors. The N-domain is connected to the D1 domain by a short N-D1 linker.

Most known substrates of p97/CDC48 are modified with ubiquitin chains and degraded by the 26S proteasome. Accordingly, many p97/CDC48 coenzymes and adaptors have domains that can recognize ubiquitin. It has become evident that the interplays between ubiquitin and p97/CDC48 cofactors are critical for many of the proposed functions, although the precise role of these interactions remains to be elucidated.

Discovery 

CDC48 was discovered in a genetic screen for genes involved in cell cycle regulation in budding yeast. The screen identified several alleles of Cdc48 that affect cell growth at non-permissive temperatures. A search for the mammalian homolog of CDC48 (valosin) revealed a 97 kDa protein precursor named "valosin-containing protein (VCP)" or p97, and also showed that it was only generated as an artefact of purification rather than during physiological processing. Even without evidence that valosin is a physiological product, the VCP nomenclature continues to be used in the literature.

Tissue and subcelluar distribution 

p97/CDC48 is one of the most abundant cytoplasmic proteins in eukaryotic cells. It is ubiquitously expressed in all tissues in multicellular organisms. In humans, the mRNA expression of p97 was found to be moderately elevated in certain types of cancer.

In mammalian cells, p97 is predominantly localized to the cytoplasm, and a significant fraction is associated to membranes of cellular organelles such as the endoplasmic reticulum (ER), Golgi, mitochondria, and endosomes. The subcellular localization of CDC48 has not been fully characterized, but is likely to be similar to the mammalian counterpart. A fraction of p97/CDC48 was also found in the nucleus.

Structure 

According to the crystal structures of full-length wild-type p97, six p97 subunits assemble into a barrel-like structure, in which the N-D1 and D2 domains form two concentric, stacked rings (Figure 2).  The N-D1 ring is larger (162 Å in diameter) than the D2 ring (113 Å) due to the laterally attached N-domains. The D1 and D2 domains are highly homologous in both sequence and structure, but they serve distinct functions. For example, the hexameric assembly of p97 only requires the D1 but not the D2 domain. Unlike many bacterial AAA+ proteins, assembly of p97 hexamer does not depend on the presence of nucleotide. The p97 hexameric assembly can undergo dramatic conformational changes during nucleotide hydrolysis cycle, and it is generally believed that these conformational changes generate mechanical force, which is applied to substrate molecules to influence their stability and function.  However, how precisely p97 generates force is unclear.

The ATP hydrolysis cycle 

The ATP hydrolyzing activity is indispensable for the p97/CDC48 functions. The two ATPase domains of p97 (D1 and D2) are not equivalent because the D2 domain displays higher ATPase activity than the D1 domain in wild-type protein. Nevertheless, their activities are dependent of each other. For example, nucleotide binding to the D1 domain is required for ATP binding to the D2 domain and nucleotide binding and hydrolysis in D2 is required for the D1 domain to hydrolyze ATP.

The ATPase activity of p97 can be influenced by many factors. For example, it can be stimulated by heat or by a putative substrate protein. In Leishmania infantum, the LiVCP protein is essential for the intracellular development of the parasite and its survival under heat stress. Association with cofactors can have either positive or negative impact on the p97 ATPase activity.

Mutations in p97 can also influence its activity. For example, p97 mutant proteins carrying single point mutations found in patients with multisystem proteinopathy (MSP; formerly known as IBMPFD (inclusion body myopathy associated with Paget disease of the bone and frontotemporal dementia)) (see below) have 2-3fold increase in ATPase activity.

p97/CDC48-interacting proteins 

Recent proteomic studies have identified a large number of p97-interacting proteins. Many of these proteins serve as adaptors that link p97/CDC48 to a particular subcellular compartment to function in a specific cellular
pathway.  Others function as adaptors that recruit substrates to p97/CDC48 for processing. Some p97-interacting proteins are also enzymes such as N-glycanase, ubiquitin ligase, and deubiquitinase, which assist p97 in processing substrates.

Most cofactors bind p97/CDC48 through its N-domain, but a few interact with the short carboxy-terminal tail in p97/CDC48. Representative proteins interacting with the N-domain are Ufd1, Npl4, p47 and FAF1.  Examples of cofactors that interact with the carboxy-terminal tail of p97 are PLAA, PNGase, and Ufd2.

The molecular basis for cofactor binding has been studied for some cofactors that interact with the p97 N-domain.  The N-domain consists of two sub-domains of roughly equal size: the N-terminal double Y-barrel and a C-terminal b-barrel (Figure 3).  Structural studies show that many cofactor proteins bind to the N-domain at a cleft formed between the two sub-domains.

Among those that bind to the N-domain of p97, two most frequently occurring sequence motifs are found: one is called UBX motif (ubiquitin regulatory X) and the other is termed VIM (VCP-interacting motif).  The UBX domain is an 80-residue module with a fold highly resembling the structure of ubiquitin. The VCP-interacting motif (VIM) is a linear sequence motif (RX5AAX2R) found in a number of p97 cofactors including gp78, SVIP (small VCP-inhibiting protein) and VIMP (VCP interacting membrane protein). Although the UBX domain uses a surface loop whereas the VIM forms a-helix to bind p97, both UBX and VIM bind at the same location between the two sub-domains of the N-domain (Figure 3).  It was proposed that hierarchical binding to distinct cofactors may be essential for the broad functions of p97/CDC48.

Function 

p97/CDC48 performs diverse functions through modulating the stability and thus the activity of its substrates.  The general function of p97/CDC48 is to segregate proteins from large protein assembly or immobile cellular structures such as membranes or chromatin, allowing the released protein molecules to be degraded by the proteasome. The functions of p97/CDC48 can be grouped into the following three major categories.

Protein quality control 

The best characterized function of p97 is to mediate a network of protein quality control processes in order to maintain protein homeostasis. These include endoplasmic reticulum-associated protein degradation (ERAD) and mitochondria-associated degradation. In these processes, ATP hydrolysis by p97/CDC48 is required to extract aberrant proteins from the membranes of the ER or mitochondria.  p97/CDC48 is also required to release defective translation products stalled on ribosome in a process termed ribosome-associated degradation.  It appears that only after extraction from the membranes or large protein assembly like ribosome, can polypeptides be degraded by the proteasome.  In addition to this ‘segregase’ function, p97/CDC48 might have an additional role in shuttling the released polypeptides to the proteasome.  This chaperoning function seems to be particularly important for degradation of certain aggregation-prone misfolded proteins in nucleus. Several lines of evidence also implicate p97 in autophagy, a process that turns over cellular proteins (including misfolded ones) by engulfing them into double-membrane-surrounded vesicles named autophagosome, but the precise role of p97 in this process is unclear.

Chromatin-associated functions 

p97 also functions broadly in eukaryotic nucleus by releasing protein molecules from chromatins in a manner analogous to that in ERAD. The identified p97 substrates include transcriptional repressor α2 and RNA polymerase (Pol) II complex and CMG DNA helicase in budding yeast, and the DNA replicating licensing factor CDT1, DNA repairing proteins DDB2 and XPC, mitosis regulator Aurora B, and certain DNA polymerases in mammalian cells. These substrates link p97 function to gene transcription, DNA replication and repair, and cell cycle progression.

Membrane fusion and trafficking 

Biochemical and genetic studies have also implicated p97 in fusion of vesicles that lead to the formation of Golgi apparatus at the end of mitosis.  This process requires the ubiquitin binding adaptor p47 and a p97-associated deubiquitinase VCIP135, and thus connecting membrane fusion to the ubiquitin pathways. However, the precise role of p97 in Golgi formation is unclear due to lack of information on relevant substrate(s). Recent studies also suggest that p97 may regulate vesicle trafficking from plasma membrane to the lysosome, a process termed endocytosis.

Clinical significance

Links to human diseases 
Mutations in VCP were first reported to cause a syndrome characterized by frontotemporal dementia, inclusion body myopathy, and Paget's disease of the bone by Virginia Kimonis in 2004. In 2010, mutations in VCP were also found to be a cause of amyotrophic lateral sclerosis by Bryan Traynor and Adriano Chiò. This discovery was notable as it represented an initial genetic link between two disparate neurological diseases, amyotrophic lateral sclerosis and frontotemporal dementia. In 2020, Edward Lee described a distinct hypomorphic mutation in VCP associated with vacuolar tauopathy, a unique subtype of frontotemporal lobar degeneration with tau inclusions.

Mutations in VCP are an example of pleiotropy, where mutations in the same gene give rise to different phenotypes. The term multisystem proteinopathy (MSP) has been coined to describe this particular form of pleiotropy. Although MSP is rare, growing interest in this syndrome derives from the molecular insights the condition provides into the etiological relationship between common age-related degenerative diseases of muscle, bone and brain. It has been estimated that ~50% of MSP may be caused by missense mutations affecting the valosin-containing protein (VCP) gene.

Cancer therapy 

The first p97 inhibitor Eeyarestatin (EerI) was discovered by screening and characterizing compounds that inhibit the degradation of a fluorescence-labeled ERAD substrate. The mechanism of p97 inhibition by EerI is unclear, but when applied to cells, it induces biological phenotypes associated with p97 inhibition such as ERAD inhibition, ER stress elevation, and apoptosis induction. Importantly, EerI displays significant cancer-killing activity in vitro preferentially against cancer cells isolated from patients, and it can synergize with the proteasome inhibitor bortezomib to kill cancer cells. These observations prompt the idea of targeting p97 as a potential cancer therapy. This idea was further confirmed by studying several ATP competitive and allosteric inhibitors. More recently, a potent and specific p97 inhibitor CB-5083 has been developed, which demonstrates promising anti-cancer activities in mouse xenograft tumor models.  The compound is now being evaluated in a phase 1 clinical trial.

Notes

References

Further reading

External links 
 GeneReviews/NIH/NCBI/UW entry on Inclusion Body Myopathy with Paget Disease of Bone and/or Frontotemporal Dementia